The 75th Primetime Emmy Awards will honor the best in American prime time television programming from June 1, 2022, until May 31, 2023, as chosen by the Academy of Television Arts & Sciences. The ceremony will be held on September 18, 2023, and will be broadcast in the United States on Fox, with the Creative Arts Emmys to be presented on September 9 and 10. Nominations will be announced on July 12, 2023.

Category and rule changes
In June 2022, the Academy of Television Arts & Sciences, also known as the Television Academy, announced the elimination of the "hanging episode" rule for the 2023 ceremony. In previous years, episodes that aired after the May 31 eligibility deadline but before nominations voting began could be placed on a Television Academy platform for viewing. Following the rule change, all episodes must air for a national audience by May 31, or those episodes will be moved to the following ceremony; if the program does not air a new season in that following year, the episodes would be eligible for individual achievement awards only.

Following a realignment between the Primetime Emmy Awards and Daytime Emmy Awards for the 2022 ceremonies, the Television Academy and the National Academy of Television Arts and Sciences announced in August 2022 that game shows would move to the primetime ceremony. New categories include Outstanding Game Show and Outstanding Host for a Game Show. To accommodate the change, the eligibility window for game shows will span from January 1, 2022, to May 31, 2023. Additionally, to avoid confusion over where programs qualify, Outstanding Competition Program was renamed to Outstanding Reality Competition Program. Game shows featuring children as contestants are eligible for the Children's and Family Emmy Awards only.

More rule changes were announced in December 2022. Most notably, the variety categories were rearranged, with Outstanding Variety Talk Series and Outstanding Variety Sketch Series becoming Outstanding Talk Series and Outstanding Scripted Variety Series. The first category covers programs focused on "unscripted interviews or panel discussions between a host/hosts and guest celebrities or personalities", while the second covers those that "consist of discrete scenes, musical numbers, monologues, comedy stand-ups, sketches, etc." The move was seen as an attempt to resolve the dwindling number of variety sketch series and to separate news-focused programs from more variety-focused talk shows; the existing categories were initially merged in late 2020 before being split again a few months later. Other changes included caps on nominations-round voting and changes to tracked categories.

References

External links
 Academy of Television Arts and Sciences website

September 2023 events in North America
2023 awards in the United States
2023 in American television
2023 in Los Angeles
2023 television awards
2023 television specials
075